Robot Odyssey is a puzzle video game developed by Mike Wallace, Dr. Leslie Grimm and published by The Learning Company in December 1984. It was released for the Apple II, TRS-80 Color Computer, and DOS. Most players have found it incredibly challenging. The player is readying for bed when, suddenly, they fall through the floor into an underground city of robots, Robotropolis. The player begins in the sewers of the city with three programmable robots, and must make their way to the top of the city to try to find their way home again.

Gameplay
The aim of Robot Odyssey is to program and control robots (Sparky, Checkers, and Scanner with a fourth added in later levels) in order to escape Robotropolis, a labyrinthine underground city filled with hundreds of rooms of puzzles that need to be solved to progress any further. The city consists of five levels of increasing difficulty, requiring the design of more and more sophisticated circuits.

A tutorial and robot testing laboratory (the "Innovation Lab") are also provided with the game.

Except for their color and initial programming, the three robots are identical inside. They are equipped with four thrusters and bumper sensors, a grabber, a radio antenna (for basic communication with other robots), a battery, and a periscope to use while riding inside a robot.

Throughout the game, the player is presented with various challenges which require programming the three robots to accomplish various tasks. This is done by wiring a synchronous digital circuit, consisting of logic gates and flip-flops, inside of the robots. Tasks and puzzles range from navigating a simple maze and retrieving items to complex tasks requiring interaction and communication between two or more robots. Though the player can ride inside the robots, most challenges involve the robots acting autonomously and cannot be completed with the player inside (and perhaps simply rewiring their robot on the fly).

The robots can also be wired up to chips, which provide a convenient and reproducible way to program the robots. Various pre-programmed chips are scattered throughout the city and range from complex circuits such as a wall-hugging chip which can be used to navigate through mazes and corridors (one of which is wired to a robot at the beginning) to clocks and counters. The player must find out how these chips work themselves, as the only information about each chip is a short, and sometimes cryptic, description. Additionally, there are predesigned chip files stored on the various disks containing the game that can be loaded into the in-game chips. The available chips stored in this fashion vary depending on the port or version used.

The Innovation Lab can be used to test out circuit designs in the robots or create new chips. Chips created in the lab can then be loaded into and used in the main game. Loading a chip in the main game will erase the previous programming stored in the chip.

Although the game is recommended for ages 10 and up, it can prove to be quite challenging even for adults. In terms of educational value, the game teaches the basic concepts of electrical engineering and digital logic in general.

Reception
Computer Gaming World reviewed Robot Odyssey and ChipWits, preferring the former to the latter but stating that they were "incredibly vivid simulation experiences".

Reviews
 Casus Belli #23 (Dec 1984)

Similar games
The engine for the game was written by Warren Robinett, and variants of it were used in many of The Learning Company's graphical adventure games of the time, including Rocky's Boots, Gertrude's Secrets, Gertrude's Puzzles, and Think Quick!, all of which are similar but easier logic puzzle games. The gameplay and visual design were derived from Robinett's influential Atari 2600 video game, Adventure.

Carnage Heart involves programming mechas that then fight without any user input.

Cognitoy's MindRover is a relatively recent game which is similar in spirit to Robot Odyssey, but uses different programming concepts in its gameplay.

ChipWits by Doug Sharp and Mike Johnston, a game for the Apple II, Macintosh, and Commodore 64 computers, is similar in both theme and implementation, although the interface to program your robot differed.

Epsitec Games created Colobot and Ceebot in recent years for Windows machines which are in many ways spiritual successors to Robot Odyssey. In these games the player programs machines to accomplish puzzle tasks. Instead of using logic flops, switches, etc., these two games instead teach the player the fundamentals of object-oriented programming like Java, C++, or C#.

One Girl One Laptop productions created a spiritual successor called Gate which uses the same digital logic puzzles as Robot Odyssey.

There is also a clone written in Java, DroidQuest, which contains all of the original levels and an additional secret level.

Further reading 
 Escape from Robotropolis - 1988 book by Fred D'Ignazio, published by TOR

See also

 Logic simulation

References

External links
 
 droidquest.com - a reimplementation in Java
 A binary patch for running Robot Odyssey on modern computers
 Robot Odyssey chip disassembler
 A version playable in the browser
 Disk image from Internet Archive

1984 video games
Apple II games
DOS games
TRS-80 Color Computer games
Puzzle video games
Programming games
Video games about robots
The Learning Company games
Video games developed in the United States